The following is the final results of the 1963 World Wrestling Championships. Freestyle competition were held in Sofia, Bulgaria and Greco-Roman competition were held in Helsingborg, Sweden.

Medal table

Team ranking

Medal summary

Men's freestyle

Men's Greco-Roman

References
FILA Database

World Wrestling Championships
W
W
1963 in sport wrestling
1963 in Bulgarian sport
1963 in Swedish sport